"Vampires Will Never Hurt You" is the debut single as well as the lead single and third track from My Chemical Romance's debut album, I Brought You My Bullets, You Brought Me Your Love.

Background
Gerard Way has said this song, "Skylines and Turnstiles" and "Headfirst for Halos" are the most important songs on the album.
Way has also stated "Vampires Will Never Hurt You" is his favorite song of all time, and his favorite vocal performance he has ever done.

Music video
The music video consists of My Chemical Romance tightly packed into a room where they play their instruments in very little color. In the video, Frank Iero is seen singing backup for Gerard Way along with lead guitar player Ray Toro. Though the video was shown at the record release show for My Chemical Romance's first album, it was only officially released when the album I Brought You My Bullets, You Brought Me Your Love was re-released in 2005. The re-release included this music video, as well as the one for "Honey, This Mirror Isn't Big Enough for the Two of Us". The re-release also had an Eyeball Records CD included along with it.

Promotion
For the 20th anniversary of I Brought You My Bullets, You Brought Me Your Love's release, a very limited amount of copies of a Flexi disc featuring the song were released. On the same day, the Instagram page for Nada Recording Studio, the place where Vampires as well as the rest of the Bullets album was recorded, uploaded a clip of a demo version of the song which had not been released before.

Track listings

References

My Chemical Romance songs
2002 debut singles
Songs written by Gerard Way
Songs about vampires
2002 songs